Acleris robinsoniana, Robinson's acleris moth, is a species of moth of the family Tortricidae. It is found in North America, where it has been recorded from the north-eastern United States across southern Canada to British Columbia and south to California.

The length of the forewings is 8.1–8.7 mm. Adults have a variable forewing pattern, ranging from uniform brown, to specimens with a white basal area and brown outer area or even specimens with a dark blue-grey ground colour with a yellow dorsal margin. There are up to two generations per year with adults on wing from May to June.

The larvae feed on Rosa californica. Young larvae fold or tie developing leaves and feed on the upper surface. Older larvae fold leaves and feed on the apical half. The species overwinters as an adult.

References

Moths described in 1923
robinsoniana
Moths of North America